Dreuxilla Divine (born Nelson Roldán; January 12, 1974) is a Puerto Rican drag queen character on television. Divine has gained major popularity as a drag performer both in Puerto Rico and eastern United States cities such as New York and Miami. She is also a comedian, a pageant host and a fashion critic.

Divine has been featured in various television related articles and covers of several show-biz magazines, such as: Vea, Teve Guía, Colony Magazine, and in a centerfold of daily newspaper Primera Hora.

Dreuxilla was the host of a daily television variety show, opposite Puerto Rican journalist Milly Cangiano, titled: Sacando Chispas (Extracting Sparks), created by Puerto Rican television producer Luisito Vigoreaux and broadcast by Televicentro in Puerto Rico and cable network WAPA America located in Springfield, Massachusetts throughout the United States.  It was broadcast live in the afternoon, and repeated on tape, late night. It has been acknowledged by television audiences nationwide and internationally. As of December 31, 2008, Dreuxilla was unemployed. However, Divine is known to often make appearances in TV shows and interviews, as well as being the occasional host of parties, awards, and the like.

From July 12–15, 2007, Dreuxilla was one of the star MC's of the yearly event Las Fiestas de la Bahía, (The Bay Parties) in Old San Juan, Puerto Rico.

The identity of the male comedian that embodies Dreuxilla Divine was, for a very long time, a very well kept secret. As of 2013, she was co-hosting the popular television show Pegate al Medio Dia.

See also
 List of television presenters/P.R.
 List of television reporters/P.R.
 List of talk show hosts/Letter D

References

External links
 https://web.archive.org/web/20070428052459/http://www.dreuxilladivine.com/
 
 https://web.archive.org/web/20070924080844/http://www.dreuxilladivine.com/images3/MtrsPR2004/index.htm

1974 births
Living people
People from Río Piedras, Puerto Rico
Puerto Rican drag queens
American television talk show hosts
Puerto Rican LGBT entertainers
Puerto Rican LGBT actors
Puerto Rican television actresses
Puerto Rican comedians
Puerto Rican television personalities
American drag queens
21st-century American comedians
21st-century American actresses
21st-century LGBT people